Bursera tonkinensis is a species of plant in the Burseraceae family. It is endemic to Vietnam and listed as "vulnerable."

References

Endemic flora of Vietnam
tonkinensis
Vulnerable plants
Plants described in 1907
Taxonomy articles created by Polbot